

The IAR-818 was a Romanian multipurpose aircraft based on the IAR-817. It was developed by IAR in both landplane and floatplane forms.

Variants
IAR-818 Landplane utility aircraft
IAR-818H Floatplane with twin floats and added ventral fin

Specifications

References

 

818